The Bridgewater railway line is a former passenger railway service on the Adelaide to Wolseley line in the Adelaide Hills. It was served by suburban services from Adelaide. On 26 July 1987, the service was curtailed to Belair and renamed Belair railway line. In 1995, the Adelaide-Wolseley line was converted to standard gauge as part of the One Nation infrastructure program, disconnecting the abandoned Bridgewater line stations from the broad gauge suburban railway system.

History
The line from Adelaide to Belair/Bridgewater was opened in 1883, and headed east from Belair parallel to the northern side of Belair National Park. It then turned south through the national park and then turned east again, where the National Park station used to be. It continued east past Long Gully and Nalawort to Upper Sturt, 28.9 km from Adelaide station. Five hundred metres later the track turned north east and continued to Mount Lofty, 31 km from Adelaide.  After that it turned south and reached Heathfield (33 km), just after the line turned north east, passing Madurta, then Aldgate (34.5 km). The line continued east, passing Jibilla and Carripook and finally, the line terminated at Bridgewater, 37.3 km by rail from Adelaide.

The Bridgewater line had a fairly steep grade for most of the journey, sometimes resulting in derailments due to the tight bends. Services from Adelaide to Bridgewater usually took an average of one hour (stopping all stations), and about 50 minutes (express). Only one train every two hours operated during off-peak and weekends (most terminating at Belair) and no more than two trains per hour in either direction during peak-hours. This was because the line was single track (which is still the case today) with crossing loops located at Belair, Long Gully, Mount Lofty, Aldgate and Bridgewater.

Closure and legacy 
When the more direct South Eastern Freeway opened in the late 1960s, patronage to Bridgewater declined heavily, as more people had access to cars and the car journey was much quicker and shorter. In 1985, the State Transport Authority sought to have the service withdrawn. The line had 12 services on weekdays, nine on Saturdays and five on Sundays. On 26 July 1987, passenger services to Bridgewater were withdrawn, attributed to high cost of operation and low passenger numbers. All stations beyond Belair were closed, and all suburban trains now terminate at Belair.

In 1995, the Adelaide-Wolseley railway line was converted from broad gauge (1600mm) to standard gauge (1435 mm) ruling out any restoration of local trains to Bridgewater or beyond (until the Belair line is converted to standard gauge, at least). Between Goodwood and Belair, the former double track route became two parallel single lines, one broad gauge for suburban services (owned by the State Government), the other standard gauge for interstate and freight services (owned by the Federal Government). Along with this conversion, stations on the Belair line at Mile End Goods, Millswood (later reopened in 2014), Hawthorn and Clapham closed; the other Belair line stations each had one platform closed.

Route 
Services on the Bridgewater line were mainly operated by Redhen railcars, with the 2000 class railcars occasionally used in its final years. Services ran from Adelaide with trains along the line terminating either at Belair or Bridgewater. On special occasions after 1987, such as the Oakbank Easter Racing Carnival held every Easter weekend at Oakbank, trains ran further east to terminate at Balhannah. However, this service ceased prior to the standard gauge conversion, due to the expense of operating the line..

Line guide 
(Note: dates are those that are indicated in each individual article)

References

Closed railway lines in South Australia
Railway lines opened in 1883
Railway lines closed in 1987
Standard gauge railways in Australia